Friedrich August Valentin Voit von Salzburg (1734-1798) was a commander of military units from Ansbach-Bayreuth. During the American Revolutionary War, Great Britain rented auxiliary troops from various German states. Voit commanded the First Regiment of the Ansbach Regiment led by Friedrich Ludwig Albrecht von Eyb, designated the Voit Regiment. In May 1778, Eyb left and Voit took charge of the regiment. Also, he was in command of all Ansbach troops in North America by the time the war had ended.

References 

Personnel of German units of the American Revolutionary War
Major generals of Prussia
1734 births
1798 deaths
People from the Principality of Ansbach
German military personnel of the Seven Years' War